The Landmark Conference is an intercollegiate athletic conference affiliated with the NCAA's Division III. Member institutions are located in the eastern United States in the states of Maryland, New Jersey, and Pennsylvania, plus Washington, D.C.

History

The conference was established on December 5, 2005. When the creation of the new conference was officially announced on December 13, another member institution was included, the Stevens Institute of Technology, but ended up joining the Empire 8. Finally, in November 2006, the University of Scranton became the eighth charter member institution. John A. Reeves began his service as commissioner of the Landmark Conference earlier on September 1. He was succeeded by Daniel A. Fisher in 2012.  Katie Boldvich began her tenure as the conference's third Commissioner in July 2019. The first intra-conference competition was played on September 15, 2007, at Kings Point, New York, when the University of Scranton defeated the United States Merchant Marine Academy 2–1 in men's soccer.

The Landmark Conference expanded in 2011–12 to add Marywood University in men's and women's swimming and diving, and to add Washington & Jefferson in men's lacrosse. Both Colleges have since left the conference in their original sports in the 2018–19 and 2014–15 seasons, respectively. Marywood University has since become an associate member in women's golf in the 2018–19 season.

Elizabethtown College became the newest member of the conference on July 1, 2014.

On May 22, 2015, Merchant Marine announced that it accepted an invitation to rejoin the Skyline Conference—a league in which it had been a charter member—effective the 2016–17 school year.

On February 10, 2022, the Landmark Conference announced that Wilkes University and Lycoming College accepted invitations to the conference and Landmark would begin sponsoring football starting in the 2023-24 season.

On April 1, 2022, Keystone College was announced to be joining the Landmark Conference as an associate member in football starting in the 2023-24 season.

On May 13, 2022, a crossover football scheduling agreement was announced between the Landmark Conference and Empire 8 to have members of both conferences fill vacancies within their respective schedules with non-conference opponents with each institution playing two contests (one home, one away) against opponents from the other conference.

Chronological timeline
 2005 - On December 5, 2005, the Landmark Conference was established, which its charter members: The Catholic University of America, Drew University, Goucher College, Juniata College, Moravian College, Susquehanna University and the United States Merchant Marine Academy (Merchant Marine), effective beginning the 2007-08 academic year.
 2006 - In November 2006, the University of Scranton became the eighth charter member institution, alongside the other 7 charter members, also effective for the 2007-08 academic year.
 2011 - Two universities joined the Landmark as associate members: Marywood University for men's and women's swimming and diving, and Washington & Jefferson College for men's lacrosse; both effective in the 2011-12 academic year.
 2014 - Elizabethtown College joined the Landmark, effective in the 2014-15 academic year.
 2015 - Washington & Jefferson left the Landmark as an associate member for men's lacrosse, effective after the 2015 spring season (2014-15 academic year).
 2016 - U.S. Merchant Marine left the Landmark to re-join back to the Skyline Conference, effective after the 2015-16 academic year.
 2017 - Marywood added women's golf to its Landmark associate membership, effective in the 2018 spring season (2017-18 academic year).
 2019 - Marywood left the Landmark as an associate member for men's and women's swimming and diving, effective after the 2018-19 academic year.
 2022 - On February 10, 2022, Wilkes University and Lycoming College will join the Landmark, effective beginning the 2023-24 academic year. Also, the conference will begin sponsoring football starting that year. On April 1, 2022, Keystone College will join as a football associate member, effective beginning the 2023-24 academic year.

Member schools

Current members
The Landmark currently has eight full members, all are private schools:

Associate members
The Landmark currently has one associate member, which is also a private school:

Notes

Future full members
The Landmark will have two new full members, both are private schools:

Future associate members
The Landmark will have one new associate member, which will also be a private school:

Notes

Former members
The Landmark had one former full member, which was a federal school:

Former associate members
The Landmark had two former associate members, both were private schools:

Notes

Membership timeline

Sports
The Landmark Conference sponsors championships in the following sports:

Notes

Men's sponsored sports by school

Men's varsity sports not sponsored by the Landmark Conference that are played by Landmark schools

Notes

Women's sponsored sports by school

Women's varsity sports not sponsored by the Landmark Conference that are played by Landmark schools

Notes

Conference champions

Fall 2021

Winter 2021-22

Spring 2022

Logo
During January 2007, a contest was announced to design a logo for the newly formed Landmark Conference. The contest was only open to undergraduate students from the conference schools. In a first phase, a panel of judges selected a winner at each of the eight Landmark schools. Winners received $250 each. In a second and final round, on February 6, in Washington, D.C., the presidents of the Landmark schools selected the final design from among the eight first round winners. The logo submitted by Susquehanna University's graphic design major, Manor member, and men's lacrosse player Tim Storck ’08, of Cockeysville, Maryland, was selected. Storck was awarded the $1,000 additional prize. Selected colors were maroon (Pantone 1815) and blue (Pantone 281).

References

External links